Samuel Whittemore (July 27, 1696 – February 2, 1793) was an American farmer and soldier. He was 78 years old when he became the oldest known colonial combatant in the American Revolutionary War (1775–1783).

Biography
Whittemore was born in Charlestown, Massachusetts, in 1696, the second son by that name of Samuel Whittemore and Hannah Rix, also of Charlestown. He served as a private in Col. Jeremiah Moulton's Third Massachusetts Regiment, where he fought in King George's War (1744–48). He was involved in the capture of the French stronghold, the Fortress of Louisbourg in 1745. He moved to Menotomy, Massachusetts (present-day Arlington).  Recent sources suggest he fought in the French and Indian War (1754–63) at the age of 64, once again assisting in the capture of the Fortress of Louisbourg, and later in a military expedition against Chief Pontiac in 1763. None of them offer documentation to support such claims, though a nineteenth century reference mentions that he had served as a "Captain of Dragoons."

Battles of Lexington and Concord
On April 19, 1775, British forces were returning to Boston from the Battles of Lexington and Concord, the opening engagements of the war. On their march they were continually shot at by American militiamen.

Whittemore was in his fields when he spotted an approaching British relief brigade under Earl Percy, sent to assist the retreat. Whittemore loaded his musket and ambushed the British grenadiers of the 47th Regiment of Foot from behind a nearby stone wall, killing one soldier. He then drew his dueling pistols, killed a second grenadier and mortally wounded a third. By the time Whittemore had fired his third shot, a British detachment had reached his position; Whittemore drew his sword and attacked. He was subsequently shot in the face, bayoneted numerous times, and left for dead in a pool of blood. He was found by colonial forces, trying to load his musket to resume the fight. He was taken to Dr. Cotton Tufts of Medford, who perceived no hope for his survival. However, Whittemore recovered and lived another 18 years until dying of natural causes at the age of 96.

Legacy
A monument stands in the corner plot (611 Mass Ave) called Whittemore Park at the northeast corner of Massachusetts Avenue and Mystic Street in Arlington, Massachusetts; it reads (inaccurately as to age both at the time and 18 years later):

Near this spot, Samuel Whittemore, then 80 years old, killed three British soldiers, April 19, 1775. He was shot, bayoneted, beaten and left for dead, but recovered and lived to be 98 years of age.

In 2005, Massachusetts Senator Robert Havern III proposed that Whittemore be proclaimed the official state hero of Massachusetts and his memory be commemorated on February 3 each year.

References

External links

Photo of the monument on www.alyssaboehm.com

1696 births
1793 deaths
People of Massachusetts in the American Revolution
People from Arlington, Massachusetts
People of Massachusetts in the French and Indian War
18th-century English people
Burials in Massachusetts
People from Charlestown, Boston
People from colonial Boston